A Slight Case of Larceny is a 1953 comedy film directed by Don Weis, written by Jerry Davis, and starring Mickey Rooney, Eddie Bracken, Elaine Stewart, Marilyn Erskine, Douglas Fowley and Robert Burton. It was released on June 5, 1953, by Metro-Goldwyn-Mayer.

Plot

Cast
Mickey Rooney as Augustus 'Geechy' Cheevers
Eddie Bracken as Frederick Winthrop Clopp
Elaine Stewart as Beverly Ambridge
Marilyn Erskine as Mrs. Emily Clopp
Douglas Fowley as Mr. White
Charles Halton as Willard Maibrunn
Henry Slate as Motor Cop
Rudy Lee as Tommy Clopp
Mimi Gibson as Mary Ellen Clopp

Reception
According to MGM records, the film earned $448,000 in the US and Canada and $143,000 elsewhere, making a loss to the studio of $104,000.

References

External links

1953 films
Metro-Goldwyn-Mayer films
Films directed by Don Weis
American crime comedy films
1950s crime comedy films
American black-and-white films
1950s English-language films
1950s American films